"Basique" is a song by French hip hop artist Orelsan released in September 2017. The song has peaked at number 9 on the French Singles Chart.

Charts

Certifications

References

2017 singles
2017 songs
French-language songs
Orelsan songs
Songs written by Skread
Songs written by Orelsan